The tennis tournament at the 2003 Southeast Asian Games was held from December 5 to December 12 in Lan Anh Gymnasium, Ho Chi Minh City, Vietnam.

Medalists

Results

Men's team

Quarter-final

Semi-final

Final

Women's team

Quarter-final

Semi-final

Final

Men's singles

Women's singles

Men's doubles

Women's doubles

Mixed doubles

Medal table
(Host nation in bold.)

References

Results
Hai van dong vien Viet Nam vao ban ket mon quan vot. 05.12.2003. Retrieved on 2016-02-23. 
Tenis Beregu Indonesia Maju ke Semifinal. Tempo Interaktif /  05.12.2003. Retrieved on 2016-02-23. 
Tenis Putra Sumbang Emas, Putri Perak. Tempo Interaktif /  07.12.2003. Retrieved on 2016-03-03. 
Liputan SEA Games XXII: Prima dan Febi Melaju. Suara Merdeka /  09.12.2003.Retrieved on 2016-03-03. 
Liputan Sea Games XXII: Ganda Campuran Pastikan Satu Emas. Suara Merdeka /  10.12.2003.Retrieved on 2016-03-03. 
Liputan Sea Games XXII: Prima Gagal, Febi Lolos. Suara Merdeka /  11.12.2003.Retrieved on 2016-03-03. 
Results from SEA GAMES 2003 - VIETNAM - XXII. SEA GAMES at Hanoi /  12.12.2003. The Star Online. Retrieved on 2016-02-23.
Results from SEA GAMES 2003 - VIETNAM - XXII.  SEA GAMES at Hanoi /  13.12.2003. The Star Online. Retrieved on 2016-02-23.

External links
2003 SEA Games Official Site: Tennis

2003 Southeast Asian Games
Southeast Asian Games
2003 Southeast Asian Games events
Tennis in Vietnam